The Noriker horse, also called the Norico-Pinzgauer and historically known as the Pinzgauer horse, is a moderately heavy Austrian draught horse breed.  The Noriker is considered  indigenous to the central Alpine region of Europe, and is believed to have originated around the highest mountain of Austria, the Grossglockner. This region was once known as the Roman province of Noricum.  At the end of the 19th century the original name Pinzgauer horse was changed to Noriker horse, due in part to the Romanophile attitude in this time.

The breed played an important role in the transportation of goods through the Alps, carrying salt, gold and Celtic iron from Salzburg to Italy, and on the return journey bringing back wine and spices.  This use developed a powerful, long, deep-barreled and sure-footed draught horse as an adaptation to the alpine terrain.  The use of Noriker horses in agriculture started much later, during the industrialisation period in the 20th century.

The Pinzgauer High Mobility All-Terrain Vehicle takes its name from this breed.

History

Up to the end of the 19th century, Noriker horses were an important link in the trade between central Europe and the Adriatic.
Very early in the breeding history of the Noriker horse, baroque horses also played an important role.  With the establishment of the stud farm Rif, near Salzburg in 1565, the phase of the refinement by Neapolitan and Iberian stallions began, which exerted their influence on the Noriker horse until 1806.  Down to the present day this influence is visible in the conformation of these horses: Roman heads with a powerful and compact topline, long manes and tails.  Baroque influence is also visible in coat colours, with a large number of black horses as well as blue roans, called mohrenkopf referring directly to the Italian expression testa di moro or capo moro, meaning "dark head" or "Moor (dark) head".  Besides Mohrenköpfen, the leopard spotted coat colour, named tiger (reflecting the linguistic absence of a distinction between "tiger" and "leopard" cats), is still an active breeding objective of the breed as well, which is unusual for nearly all other European horse breeds.

In 1903, the studbook was closed.  Since then, Noriker horses are strictly purebred.  The years between the two world wars were when the popularity of the Noriker horse peaked, and the population grew constantly.  However, after the Second World War, mechanisation started to take over, though in the poorer mountainous regions of Austria the machinery was not affordable, so horses in the Alps have continued to be part of everyday life until about 1968, when the Noriker horse population, then at 34,510 head, began to decline.

The late 1970s were called the crisis of horse breeding in Europe, and within about twenty years, 80% of the Noriker horses disappeared, a fact that was directly connected to the third wave of mechanisation.  By 1985, only 6,996 Noriker horses survived.  While today, many draught horse breeds of Europe are endangered, the Noriker has rebounded to some extent, and currently about 10,000 Noriker horses are living in the Austrian countryside. The Noriker is also bred in Italy, predominantly in the Puster Valley and the five Ladin valleys, areas formerly in Austria-Hungary. Under the name Norico-Pinzgauer, it is one of the fifteen indigenous horse "breeds of limited distribution" recognised by the AIA, the Italian breeders' association, which also publishes the Italian breed standard. The regional breeders' federation is the same as that for the Haflinger, the Provincial Federation of South Tyrol Haflinger Horse Breeders.

The Abtenauer 

Unlike the main population, this Abtenauer strain did not carry the leopard-spotting gene; the most usual colours were chestnut, black and blue roan. It had quality gaits and was noted as a good trotter. The breed’s primary use was to  transport wood over steep terrain. It was absorbed into the main Noriker population.

Characteristics
The Noriker is a moderately heavy mountain draught horse with a low centre of gravity, sure-footed, and with a good sense of balance. The head should be dry, typy and should express draught horse characteristics. The neck is strong with visible musculature. The shoulder should be long and well positioned. The width of chest is broad and deep, the croup is very muscular. Special attention is placed on correct position of the short legs having strong clean joints and little feathering.

Due to its colour varieties, the Noriker enjoys large popularity.  Beside the basic coat colours bay, black and chestnut, there are spotted Leopard complex horses, Mohrenköpfe (blue roan), and other roan colours, tobianos and overos.  Grey does not occur.

Sire lines
There are five sire lines:
Vulkan-Line Since the foundation of the Noriker stud books, this sire line has been the most popular one.  More than 50% of all present Noriker horses belong to the Vulkan line.  The line was founded by the brown stallion 13 Vulkan 635; born in 1887 in the Pinzgau.  The reason for the dominance of this line was the fact that the founder stallions and their descendants represented the heavy draught horse type favoured in those times.
Nero-Line The Nero line is the second largest line in the Noriker breed, founded by the stallion 554 liz. Nero.  The famous Noriker stallion 1378 Stoissen-Nero V/977, foaled in 1931 belonged to this line.  He possessed all qualities which are also desirable in the present time.  The reasons for the major influence of the Nero-line are the same as for the Vulkan-line.
Diamant-Line The Diamant-line started promisingly in the early 20th century, but after 1950, it was surpassed by the Nero-line.  The founder of this line was 367 Bravo 149, foaled in 1877.  The name of this line origins from his great-grandson 216 Diamant 496, foaled 1903.  Horses of this line are very typy and agile.
Schaunitz-Line The Schaunitz-line was founded by the stallion Amor, born in 1888 in Tirol.  The line is named after one of his sons, 255 Schaunitz, who was born in 1896.  In former times, Schaunitz horses were famous for their lively temperament and their durable constitution.  Their sometimes difficult character could be the reason for the decline of this line in the 1980s.  Nowadays, their smaller size and pleasing conformation, combined with good movement has led to a new era of this line.
Elmar-Line The stallions of the Elmar line are mostly leopard-spotted.  The line was founded in 1896 by the stallion 80 Arnulf 55.  For this line, the Baroque influence is seen in the special coat colour, as well as a smaller size and lighter build.  It is a small sire line but valued for its leopard-spotting.

References

External links 
 

Horse breeds
Horse breeds originating in Austria
Horse breeds originating in Italy